Sippola is a former municipality of Finland in the former Kymi Province, now in Kymenlaakso. In 1975, it united with neighboring Anjala to form Anjalankoski, which was later merged into Kouvola in 2009.

Geography 
The municipality bordered Anjala, Valkeala, Luumäki, Vehkalahti and Kymi. It was located to the east of the Kymijoki.

Villages

History 
Sippola was initially known as Anikkala, first mentioned in 1544 when it was a part of the Vehkalahti parish. The name Sippola is derived from a farm name Sippula, in 1558 owned by Tuomas Sippu. The earlier name Anikkala was displaced by Sippola in the late 16th century.

The first chapel in Sippola was built by Lorentz Creutz, who owned a seat farm in the area. A new church was built in 1737. The seat farm was destroyed by Russian occupants before the Treaty of Turku in 1743. In 1784, Sippola was acquired by the von Daehn family. Sippola became a chapel community in 1823 and was separated from Vehkalahti in 1861.

A wood grindery and a paper factory were established in the village of Mämmälä in 1872. As they were established on the lands of the Inkeroinen farm, the entire village began to be called Inkeroinen. In 1970, most of Sippola's >10,000 inhabitants lived in either Inkeroinen or Myllykoski, while the village of Sippola only had 429 inhabitants.

Together with Anjala, Sippola formed the Anjalankoski municipality in 1975. Anjalankoski later joined the town of Kouvola alongside Elimäki, Jaala, Kuusankoski and Valkeala in 2009.

Church 

The current church of Sippola was built in 1878-1879. It was designed by C. J. von Heideken. The church was renovated in 1903 and again in 1927. Currently it acts as the main church of the Anjalankoski parish within Kouvola.

References 

Kouvola
Former municipalities of Finland